Longview Community Church is a historic church at 2323 Washington Way in Longview, Washington.

It was built in 1925 and added to the National Register in 1985.

References

Churches in Washington (state)
Churches on the National Register of Historic Places in Washington (state)
Gothic Revival church buildings in Washington (state)
Churches completed in 1925
Buildings and structures in Cowlitz County, Washington
National Register of Historic Places in Cowlitz County, Washington